Dyscolus is a very large genus of beetles in the family Carabidae, containing the following species:

 Dyscolus acuminatus Chevrolat, 1835
 Dyscolus acutipennis Chaudoir, 1850
 Dyscolus acutulus (Bates, 1892)
 Dyscolus acutus (Putzeys, 1878)
 Dyscolus aemulus Moret, 1996
 Dyscolus aeneipennis (Dejean, 1831)
 Dyscolus aequatorius (Chaudoir, 1879)
 Dyscolus agilis (Chaudoir, 1878)
 Dyscolus agonellus (Darlington, 1935)
 Dyscolus agonoides (Chaudoir, 1878)
 Dyscolus ahenonotus (Putzeys, 1878)
 Dyscolus albarragas (Perrault, 1988)
 Dyscolus albemarli (Vandyke, 1953)
 Dyscolus algidus Moret, 2005
 Dyscolus alpaeoides (Chaudoir, 1878)
 Dyscolus alpinus (Chaudoir, 1878)
 Dyscolus altarensis (Bates, 1891)
 Dyscolus alternans (Chaudoir, 1879)
 Dyscolus ambagiosus (Moret, 1990)
 Dyscolus amethystinus Moret & Casale, 1998
 Dyscolus ampliatus (Bates, 1882)
 Dyscolus amplicollis (Chaudoir, 1878)
 Dyscolus angulosus (Chaudoir, 1878)
 Dyscolus angustulus (Liebherr, 1992)
 Dyscolus anichtchenkoi Moret, 2019
 Dyscolus anthracinus (Putzeys, 1878)
 Dyscolus antoninus Moret, 1992
 Dyscolus aphaedrus (Chaudoir, 1859)
 Dyscolus aquator Moret, 2020
 Dyscolus araneus Moret, 2005
 Dyscolus arauzae Moret, 2020
 Dyscolus arborarius Moret, 2020
 Dyscolus arcanus Moret, 2005
 Dyscolus arenasi Moret, 2019
 Dyscolus arvalis Moret, 2005
 Dyscolus asphaltinus (Chaudoir, 1878)
 Dyscolus aterrimus (Motschulsky, 1864)
 Dyscolus atkinsi Moret, 2001
 Dyscolus atratus (Chaudoir, 1859)
 Dyscolus atroaeneus (Putzeys, 1878)
 Dyscolus aurotinctus (Bates, 1878)
 Dyscolus austerus Moret, 2005
 Dyscolus auyanensis (Monguzzi & Trezzi, 1993)
 Dyscolus bacatellus (Liebherr, 1992)
 Dyscolus baorucensis (Liebherr, 1992)
 Dyscolus barbarellus (Liebherr, 1992)
 Dyscolus barragani Moret, 2020
 Dyscolus batallon Perrault, 1993
 Dyscolus batesi Moret, 2005
 Dyscolus beryllinus (Putzeys, 1878)
 Dyscolus bicolor (Chaudoir, 1879)
 Dyscolus biovatus (Chaudoir, 1878)
 Dyscolus bispinis (Bates, 1882)
 Dyscolus bispinosus (Chaudoir, 1878)
 Dyscolus bliteus Moret, 2005
 Dyscolus bogotensis Perrault, 1992
 Dyscolus bolivianoides Perrault, 1993
 Dyscolus bolivianus Perrault, 1993
 Dyscolus bordoni Moret, 1993
 Dyscolus bousqueti Moret & Casale, 1998
 Dyscolus bracteatus (Moret, 1990)
 Dyscolus breviculus Moret, 2001
 Dyscolus brevipennis (Motschulsky, 1864)
 Dyscolus brevis (Putzeys, 1878)
 Dyscolus brocchus Moret, 1996
 Dyscolus brullei (Chaudoir, 1837)
 Dyscolus brunnellus (Liebherr, 1992)
 Dyscolus bucculentus Moret, 1991
 Dyscolus buckleyi (Chaudoir, 1879)
 Dyscolus cachetes Moret, 2001
 Dyscolus caeruleomarginatus Mannerheim, 1837
 Dyscolus caeruleus (Chaudoir, 1859)
 Dyscolus caerulipennis (Liebherr, 1992)
 Dyscolus callanga Perrault, 1992
 Dyscolus camur Moret, 1990
 Dyscolus capito (Bates, 1891)
 Dyscolus capsarius Moret, 2005
 Dyscolus capticius (Moret, 1990)
 Dyscolus carbonarius (Putzeys, 1878)
 Dyscolus carbonescens Moret, 2005
 Dyscolus casalei Moret, 1991
 Dyscolus castanipes (Bates, 1882)
 Dyscolus caucaensis Perrault, 1992
 Dyscolus caulatus Moret, 1993
 Dyscolus cazieri (Liebherr & Will, 1996)
 Dyscolus chalconotus (Chaudoir, 1878)
 Dyscolus championi (Bates, 1882)
 Dyscolus chathami (Vandyke, 1953)
 Dyscolus chaudoiri (Coquerel, 1866)
 Dyscolus chiriquinus (Bates, 1882)
 Dyscolus chontalensis (Bates, 1878)
 Dyscolus chrysopterus (Bates, 1878)
 Dyscolus chyderus (Chaudoir, 1878)
 Dyscolus chypterus (Chaudoir, 1859)
 Dyscolus ciliatus (Chaudoir, 1878)
 Dyscolus clarus (Chaudoir, 1878)
 Dyscolus cleanthes (Bates, 1884)
 Dyscolus cochabamba Perrault, 1993
 Dyscolus coloradito Perrault, 1990
 Dyscolus columbinus (Chaudoir, 1878)
 Dyscolus concisus (Bates, 1878)
 Dyscolus conicus (Chaudoir, 1879)
 Dyscolus consanguineus (Chaudoir, 1878)
 Dyscolus contumaza Perrault, 1993
 Dyscolus convergens (Bates, 1882)
 Dyscolus coptoderoides (Darlington, 1937)
 Dyscolus cordatus (Chaudoir, 1859)
 Dyscolus cordicollis (Motschulsky, 1864)
 Dyscolus cordillerensis Perrault, 1990
 Dyscolus corvinus (Dejean, 1831)
 Dyscolus costaricensis Moret & Casale, 1998
 Dyscolus cozier (Liebherr & Will, 1996)
 Dyscolus crabbei Moret, 1993
 Dyscolus crespoae Moret, 2020
 Dyscolus cristensis Perrault, 1990
 Dyscolus cruzensis Perrault, 1990
 Dyscolus crypticulus (Liebherr, 1992)
 Dyscolus culatensis Perrault, 1992
 Dyscolus cuprascens (Motschulsky, 1864)
 Dyscolus cupripennis Castelnau, 1835
 Dyscolus cursor Moret, 2005
 Dyscolus cyanellus Chaudoir, 1850
 Dyscolus cyaneocupreus (Putzeys, 1878)
 Dyscolus cyanicollis Brulle, 1834
 Dyscolus cyanides (Bates, 1882)
 Dyscolus cyanonotus Chaudoir, 1850
 Dyscolus cyanostolus (Bates, 1878)
 Dyscolus cycloderus (Chaudoir, 1859)
 Dyscolus cyphopterus Perrault, 1993
 Dyscolus cyrtonotoides Perrault, 1990
 Dyscolus danglesi Moret, 2020
 Dyscolus darwini (Vandyke, 1953)
 Dyscolus davidsoni Moret, 1994
 Dyscolus decorellus (Liebherr, 1992)
 Dyscolus defrictus Moret, 1993
 Dyscolus degallieri (Perrault, 1991)
 Dyscolus dejeanii (Chaudoir, 1859)
 Dyscolus delenitor (Moret, 1990)
 Dyscolus delicatulus (Chaudoir, 1878)
 Dyscolus denigratus (Bates, 1891)
 Dyscolus despiciendus (Chaudoir, 1878)
 Dyscolus desultor Moret, 2005
 Dyscolus deuvei Moret, 2005
 Dyscolus deyrollei (Chaudoir, 1878)
 Dyscolus dilutus (Chaudoir, 1859)
 Dyscolus diopsis (Bates, 1891)
 Dyscolus dominicensis (Bates, 1882)
 Dyscolus donosoi Moret, 2020
 Dyscolus donrwi Perrault, 1993
 Dyscolus drusillus (Bates, 1891)
 Dyscolus duplex (Bates, 1878)
 Dyscolus duportei Liebherr & Ivie, 2021
 Dyscolus dupuisi Moret, 2005
 Dyscolus durangensis (Bates, 1882)
 Dyscolus dyschirioides (Bates, 1882)
 Dyscolus dyschromus (Chaudoir, 1878)
 Dyscolus ebeninus (Chaudoir, 1878)
 Dyscolus ecuadoriensis Perrault, 1992
 Dyscolus eleonorae Moret, 2020
 Dyscolus ellipticus (Chaudoir, 1878)
 Dyscolus elliptolellus (Liebherr, 1992)
 Dyscolus elongatus (Chaudoir, 1879)
 Dyscolus epilissus (Bates, 1884)
 Dyscolus erythrocerus (Chaudoir, 1859)
 Dyscolus espejoensis (Perrault, 1989)
 Dyscolus etontii Moret, 1996
 Dyscolus eudemus (Bates, 1884)
 Dyscolus evanescens (Bates, 1882)
 Dyscolus expansus Perrault, 1993
 Dyscolus exsul Moret, 2005
 Dyscolus fallax (Moret, 1990)
 Dyscolus falli (Darlington, 1936)
 Dyscolus famelicus Moret, 2020
 Dyscolus fartilis Moret, 2005
 Dyscolus femoralis (Chaudoir, 1879)
 Dyscolus feronioides (Reiche, 1843)
 Dyscolus festinus Moret, 2005
 Dyscolus flavomarginatus (Liebherr, 1992)
 Dyscolus fragilis (Chaudoir, 1878)
 Dyscolus fratellus (Chaudoir, 1879)
 Dyscolus frigidus (Chaudoir, 1878)
 Dyscolus fronto Moret, 1998
 Dyscolus fucatus Moret, 2005
 Dyscolus funereus (Moret, 1991)
 Dyscolus furcillatus (Moret, 1991)
 Dyscolus furvus Moret, 2005
 Dyscolus fusipalpis (Bates, 1891)
 Dyscolus gaujoni (Perrault, 1989)
 Dyscolus gemellus (Moret, 1990)
 Dyscolus giachinoi (Moret, 1996)
 Dyscolus giselae Moret, 2020
 Dyscolus glaucipennis (Liebherr, 1987)
 Dyscolus globoculus Moret, 2020
 Dyscolus gobbii Moret, 2020
 Dyscolus gracilis (Chaudoir, 1859)
 Dyscolus grandicollis (Reiche, 1843)
 Dyscolus gratus (Bates, 1878)
 Dyscolus guatemalensis (Chaudoir, 1878)
 Dyscolus hapax Moret, 2005
 Dyscolus haptoderoides (Bates, 1891)
 Dyscolus harpaloides (Bates, 1891)
 Dyscolus hebeculus (Bates, 1891)
 Dyscolus hemicyclicus (Bates, 1882)
 Dyscolus hexacoelus (Chaudoir, 1879)
 Dyscolus hirsutus Moret, 2005
 Dyscolus horni (Bates, 1882)
 Dyscolus ignicauda (Bates, 1882)
 Dyscolus imbaburae Moret, 2005
 Dyscolus imitativus (Liebherr, 1992)
 Dyscolus imitator (Moret, 1990)
 Dyscolus immodicus Moret, 2005
 Dyscolus impiger Moret, 2005
 Dyscolus incomis (Bates, 1882)
 Dyscolus incommunis Moret, 2020
 Dyscolus inconspicuus (Chaudoir, 1878)
 Dyscolus incultus (Bates, 1882)
 Dyscolus intergeneus (Bates, 1878)
 Dyscolus interruptus (Putzeys, 1878)
 Dyscolus interstitialis Perrault, 1993
 Dyscolus involucer Moret, 1994
 Dyscolus iricolor (Bates, 1882)
 Dyscolus irriguus Moret, 2005
 Dyscolus isabellae Camero-R, 2010
 Dyscolus jelskii Perrault, 1990
 Dyscolus jimenezi Moret & Casale, 1998
 Dyscolus joseensis Perrault, 1990
 Dyscolus kennedyensis Camero-R, 2010
 Dyscolus lacertosus Moret, 1998
 Dyscolus lactipes (Bates, 1878)
 Dyscolus laetificus (Darlington, 1935)
 Dyscolus laetiusculus (Chaudoir, 1878)
 Dyscolus laevilateris (Bates, 1891)
 Dyscolus laevipennis (Chaudoir, 1879)
 Dyscolus laevipennoides Perrault, 1992
 Dyscolus lagunensis Perrault, 1993
 Dyscolus lamottei Perrault, 1990
 Dyscolus lamotteioides Perrault, 1990
 Dyscolus lamprotus (Bates, 1882)
 Dyscolus landolti (Putzeys, 1878)
 Dyscolus laticollis (Reiche, 1843)
 Dyscolus latidens (Chaudoir, 1859)
 Dyscolus leleupi Moret, 1993
 Dyscolus leptomorphus (Chaudoir, 1879)
 Dyscolus leucoscelis (Bates, 1882)
 Dyscolus lherminieri (Chaudoir, 1842)
 Dyscolus lignicola Moret, 1994
 Dyscolus limbicollis (Chaudoir, 1879)
 Dyscolus lionotus (Chaudoir, 1879)
 Dyscolus lissomus (Bates, 1882)
 Dyscolus lojaensis Perrault, 1993
 Dyscolus longipennis (Reiche, 1843)
 Dyscolus longipes (Chaudoir, 1878)
 Dyscolus lubricus Moret, 2001
 Dyscolus luciae (Liebherr, 1987)
 Dyscolus lucidus (Chaudoir, 1879)
 Dyscolus lucifuga Moret, 1990
 Dyscolus lucilius (Bates, 1884)
 Dyscolus lugens (Dejean, 1831)
 Dyscolus lutarius Moret, 2005
 Dyscolus lyrophorus (Chaudoir, 1878)
 Dyscolus macerrimus Moret, 2005
 Dyscolus machetellus (Liebherr, 1992)
 Dyscolus macroderus (Chaudoir, 1879)
 Dyscolus macrous (Chaudoir, 1878)
 Dyscolus maleodoratus Moret, 2005
 Dyscolus margaritulus (Liebherr, 1992)
 Dyscolus marginicollis (Chaudoir, 1859)
 Dyscolus marginissimus (Liebherr, 1992)
 Dyscolus marini Moret, 2020
 Dyscolus martinezae Moret, 2019
 Dyscolus mateui (Moret, 1991)
 Dyscolus matucana Perrault, 1993
 Dyscolus megacephalus (Bates, 1891)
 Dyscolus megalops (Bates, 1882)
 Dyscolus melanius (Bates, 1882)
 Dyscolus melanocnemis (Chaudoir, 1878)
 Dyscolus melas (Putzeys, 1878)
 Dyscolus memnonius (Dejean, 1828)
 Dyscolus meridanus (Chaudoir, 1859)
 Dyscolus metallicus (Chaudoir, 1859)
 Dyscolus metallosomus (Liebherr, 1987)
 Dyscolus micans (Putzeys, 1878)
 Dyscolus mifafi (Perrault, 1989)
 Dyscolus mimulus (Liebherr, 1992)
 Dyscolus minimus (Bates, 1884)
 Dyscolus minusculus (Liebherr, 1992)
 Dyscolus mirandus Perrault, 1993
 Dyscolus moestus (Dejean, 1831)
 Dyscolus monachus (Dejean, 1831)
 Dyscolus monasterioi (Perrault, 1989)
 Dyscolus mongusi Moret, 2005
 Dyscolus monterredonda Perrault, 1992
 Dyscolus montivagus Moret, 1998
 Dyscolus montufari Moret, 2005
 Dyscolus morenensis Perrault, 1992
 Dyscolus moreti Perrault, 1993
 Dyscolus moretianus Perrault, 1993
 Dyscolus moritzi Perrault, 1992
 Dyscolus morosus (Chaudoir, 1878)
 Dyscolus mucronatus (Moret, 1991)
 Dyscolus mucubajii Perrault, 1990
 Dyscolus mucunuque Perrault, 1993
 Dyscolus mucuy Perrault, 1992
 Dyscolus muzo Perrault, 1993
 Dyscolus nebrianus (Fairmaire, 1878)
 Dyscolus nevadicus Perrault, 1990
 Dyscolus nevermanni (Liebherr, 1992)
 Dyscolus niger (Chaudoir, 1859)
 Dyscolus nitidulus (Liebherr, 1992)
 Dyscolus nitidus Chaudoir, 1837
 Dyscolus nocticolor Moret, 2005
 Dyscolus noctuabundus Moret, 2005
 Dyscolus nubilus Moret, 2001
 Dyscolus nugax (Bates, 1878)
 Dyscolus nyctimus (Bates, 1884)
 Dyscolus obesulus (Chaudoir, 1878)
 Dyscolus obscurus (Chaudoir, 1859)
 Dyscolus obuncus Moret, 1993
 Dyscolus olivaceus (Chaudoir, 1878)
 Dyscolus omaseoides (Bates, 1891)
 Dyscolus omissus Moret, 1994
 Dyscolus onorei Moret, 1993
 Dyscolus oopteroides (Chaudoir, 1878)
 Dyscolus oopterus (Chaudoir, 1859)
 Dyscolus opalescens (Bates, 1882)
 Dyscolus orbicollis (Chaudoir, 1859)
 Dyscolus oreas (Bates, 1891)
 Dyscolus orthomus (Chaudoir, 1878)
 Dyscolus otavaloensis Perrault, 1993
 Dyscolus ovatulus (Bates, 1884)
 Dyscolus ovatus (Putzeys, 1878)
 Dyscolus pallidipes Chaudoir, 1850
 Dyscolus paramemnonius (Liebherr, 1987)
 Dyscolus parviceps (Bates, 1878)
 Dyscolus patocochae Moret, 2005
 Dyscolus patroboides (Bates, 1891)
 Dyscolus pavens (Darlington, 1935)
 Dyscolus pectoralis (Chaudoir, 1879)
 Dyscolus phaeocnemis (Chaudoir, 1879)
 Dyscolus phaeolomus (Chaudoir, 1879)
 Dyscolus physopterus (Chaudoir, 1878)
 Dyscolus piceolus (Chaudoir, 1878)
 Dyscolus picicornis (Chaudoir, 1878)
 Dyscolus piscator Moret, 2020
 Dyscolus placitus Moret, 2020
 Dyscolus platyderoides Perrault, 1990
 Dyscolus platynellus (Liebherr, 1992)
 Dyscolus platynoides (Chaudoir, 1878)
 Dyscolus platysmoides (Bates, 1891)
 Dyscolus plebeius (Chaudoir, 1879)
 Dyscolus politus (Putzeys, 1878)
 Dyscolus pollens Moret, 1991
 Dyscolus polylepidium Perrault, 1993
 Dyscolus porrectus (Chaudoir, 1878)
 Dyscolus portentosus Moret, 2005
 Dyscolus princeps (Bates, 1878)
 Dyscolus pristonychoides (Chaudoir, 1878)
 Dyscolus procephalus (Bates, 1878)
 Dyscolus prolixus (Bates, 1878)
 Dyscolus prostomis (Bates, 1878)
 Dyscolus proteinus (Bates, 1882)
 Dyscolus protensus Putzeys, 1878
 Dyscolus pseudellipticus (Liebherr, 1987)
 Dyscolus pseudoconicus Perrault, 1992
 Dyscolus pullatus Moret, 2005
 Dyscolus punctatostriatus (Putzeys, 1878)
 Dyscolus punctinotus (Liebherr, 1987)
 Dyscolus punoensis (Perrault, 1990)
 Dyscolus purpuratus Reiche, 1842
 Dyscolus purpurellus (Liebherr, 1992)
 Dyscolus purulensis (Bates, 1882)
 Dyscolus pyrophilus Moret, 2005
 Dyscolus quadricollis (Chaudoir, 1859)
 Dyscolus quadridentatus (Bates, 1882)
 Dyscolus quadrilaterus (Bates, 1882)
 Dyscolus quitensis Perrault, 1993
 Dyscolus racquelae Liebherr & Ivie, 2021
 Dyscolus raveloi (Mateu, 1978)
 Dyscolus ravidus Moret, 2020
 Dyscolus rectilineus (Bates, 1891)
 Dyscolus redondensis Perrault, 1991
 Dyscolus reflexicollis (Chaudoir, 1859)
 Dyscolus reflexus (Chaudoir, 1859)
 Dyscolus reichei (Perrault, 1989)
 Dyscolus ripicola Moret, 1990
 Dyscolus riveti Moret, 2001
 Dyscolus riveti Moret, 2005
 Dyscolus rivinus Moret, 2020
 Dyscolus robiginosus Moret, 2005
 Dyscolus robustulus (Liebherr, 1992)
 Dyscolus rotundatulus (Liebherr, 1992)
 Dyscolus rotundiceps (Bates, 1891)
 Dyscolus rubellus Moret, 1991
 Dyscolus rubidus (Chaudoir, 1878)
 Dyscolus ruficornis (Chaudoir, 1859)
 Dyscolus rufiventris (Vandyke, 1926)
 Dyscolus rufulus (Bates, 1884)
 Dyscolus rugitarsis Moret, 2020
 Dyscolus rugulellus (Liebherr, 1992)
 Dyscolus ruizi Moret, 2020
 Dyscolus ruminahui Moret, 2005
 Dyscolus russeus Moret, 1994
 Dyscolus rutilans (Motschulsky, 1864)
 Dyscolus salazarae Moret, 2020
 Dyscolus saxatilis Moret, 1993
 Dyscolus scabricollis (Bates, 1882)
 Dyscolus schunkei Perrault, 1993
 Dyscolus sciakyi Moret, 1996
 Dyscolus segnipes Moret, 1990
 Dyscolus segregatus (Bates, 1891)
 Dyscolus sellensis (Darlington, 1937)
 Dyscolus sellularius Moret, 2005
 Dyscolus semiopacus (Chaudoir, 1878)
 Dyscolus semirufus (Motschulsky, 1864)
 Dyscolus seriepunctatus (Chaudoir, 1859)
 Dyscolus severus (Chaudoir, 1878)
 Dyscolus sexfoveolatus (Chaudoir, 1878)
 Dyscolus silvestris Moret, 2020
 Dyscolus simoni Perrault, 1992
 Dyscolus sinuosus (Chaudoir, 1878)
 Dyscolus sphodroides (Chaudoir, 1859)
 Dyscolus spinifer (Bates, 1882)
 Dyscolus spinipennis (Reiche, 1843)
 Dyscolus steinheili Perrault, 1993
 Dyscolus stenophthalmus (Liebherr, 1992)
 Dyscolus steropoides (Bates, 1891)
 Dyscolus striatopunctatus (Chaudoir, 1859)
 Dyscolus striatulus (Chaudoir, 1878)
 Dyscolus subangulatus (Chaudoir, 1878)
 Dyscolus subauratus (Bates, 1882)
 Dyscolus subcyaneus (Chaudoir, 1879)
 Dyscolus subiridescens (Chaudoir, 1878)
 Dyscolus sublaevipennis Perrault, 1992
 Dyscolus subreflexus (Chaudoir, 1878)
 Dyscolus subviolaceus (Chaudoir, 1842)
 Dyscolus sulcatus (Guerin-Meneville, 1844)
 Dyscolus sulcipedis Moret, 2020
 Dyscolus superbus (Bates, 1878)
 Dyscolus tachiranus Perrault, 1993
 Dyscolus tapiarius Moret, 2005
 Dyscolus tenuicornis (Chaudoir, 1859)
 Dyscolus teter (Chaudoir, 1878)
 Dyscolus thecarum Moret, 1998
 Dyscolus thiemei Perrault, 1990
 Dyscolus tiguensis Moret, 2005
 Dyscolus tinctipennis (Bates, 1891)
 Dyscolus tovarensis Perrault, 1993
 Dyscolus transfuga (Chaudoir, 1878)
 Dyscolus transversicollis (Chaudoir, 1859)
 Dyscolus trapezicollis (Putzeys, 1878)
 Dyscolus trossulus Moret, 2005
 Dyscolus troyaensis Perrault, 1993
 Dyscolus tuberosus Moret, 2005
 Dyscolus umerangulatus Perrault, 1993
 Dyscolus unilobatus (Bates, 1882)
 Dyscolus unipunctatus Perrault, 1990
 Dyscolus valens (Bates, 1891)
 Dyscolus validus (Chaudoir, 1859)
 Dyscolus variabilis (Chaudoir, 1837)
 Dyscolus variolosus Moret, 2019
 Dyscolus vegaensis Perrault, 1992
 Dyscolus velox Moret, 2005
 Dyscolus venezolanus Perrault, 1993
 Dyscolus verecundior Moret, 2020
 Dyscolus verecundissimus Moret, 2020
 Dyscolus verecundus Moret, 1998
 Dyscolus villavicencio Perrault, 1992
 Dyscolus violaceipennis (Chaudoir, 1859)
 Dyscolus virescens (Motschulsky, 1864)
 Dyscolus viridans (Bates, 1884)
 Dyscolus viridiauratus (Bates, 1878)
 Dyscolus viridipennis (Motschulsky, 1864)
 Dyscolus whymperi Moret, 1998
 Dyscolus woldai Liebherr, 1992
 Dyscolus yanacochae Moret, 2005
 Dyscolus zunilensis (Bates, 1882)

References

Platyninae